The Khitan people were a historical nomadic people from Northeast Asia who, from the 4th century, inhabited an area corresponding to parts of modern Mongolia, Northeast China and the Russian Far East.

As a people descended from the proto-Mongols through the Xianbei, Khitans spoke the now-extinct Khitan language, a Para-Mongolic language related to the Mongolic languages. The Khitan people founded and led the Liao dynasty (916–1125), which dominated a vast area of Siberia, Mongolia and Northern China. The Khitans of the Liao dynasty used two independent writing systems for their language: Khitan small script and Khitan large script.

After the fall of the Liao dynasty in 1125 following the Jurchen invasion, many Khitans followed Yelü Dashi's group westward to establish the Qara Khitai or Western Liao dynasty, in Central Asia, which lasted nearly a century before falling to the Mongol Empire in 1218. Other regimes founded by the Khitans included the Northern Liao, Eastern Liao and Later Liao in China, as well as the Qutlugh-Khanid dynasty in Persia. The modern-day Daur people, a recognized minority ethnic group in Northeast China, are the genetic descendants of Khitans.

The historical name for China, Cathay, originates from the word Khitan.

Etymology 

There is no consensus on the etymology of the name of Khitan. There are basically three speculations. Feng Jiasheng argues that it comes from the Yuwen chieftains' names. Zhao Zhenji thinks that the term originated from Xianbei and means "a place where Xianbei had resided". Japanese scholar Otagi Matsuo believes that Khitan's original name was "Xidan", which means "the people who are similar to the Xi people" or "the people who inhabit among the Xi people".

In Slavic languages such as Russian and Ukrainian, "China" is called "". These names are derived from the Chinese Liao dynasty, which was established by the Khitan in northern China.

China 
Due to the dominance of the Khitans during the Liao dynasty in Manchuria and Mongolia and later the Qara Khitai in Central Asia where they were seen as Chinese, the term "Khitai" came to mean "China" to people near them in Central Asia, Russia and northwestern China. The name was then introduced to medieval Europe via Islamic and Russian sources, and became "Cathay". In the modern era, words related to Khitay are still used as a name for China by Turkic peoples, such as the Uyghurs in China's Xinjiang region and the Kazakhs of Kazakhstan and areas adjoining it, and by some Slavic peoples, such as the Russians and Bulgarians. The Han Chinese consider the ethnonym derived from Khitay as applied to them by the Uyghurs to be pejorative and the Chinese government has tried to ban its use.

History

Origin myth 
According to the History of Liao compiled in the 14th century, a "sacred man" (shen-ren) on a white horse had eight sons with a "heavenly woman" (tiannü) who rode in a cart pulled by a grey ox. The man came from the Tu River (Lao Ha river in modern-day Jilin, Manchuria) and the woman from the Huang River (modern-day Xar Moron river in Inner Mongolia). The pair met where the two rivers join, and the eight sons born of their union became eight tribes.

Pre-dynastic 

The earliest written reference to the Khitan is from an official history of the Xianbei Northern Wei dynasty dating to the period of the Six Dynasties. Most scholars believe the Khitan tribe splintered from the Xianbei, and some scholars believe they may have been a mixed group who also included former members of the Xiongnu tribal confederation. The Khitan shaved their heads, leaving hair on their temples which grew down to the chest, in a similar fashion to the related Kumo Xi, Shiwei and Xianbei whom they are believed to be descended from.

During their early history the Khitan were composed of eight tribes. Their territory was between the present-day Xar Moron River and Chaoyang, Liaoning. The Khitan's territory bordered Goguryeo, China and the lands of the Eastern Turks.

Between the 6th and 9th centuries, they were successively dominated by the Eastern Turkic Khaganate, the Uyghur Khaganate, and the Chinese Tang dynasty. The Khitan were less politically united than the Turkic tribes, but often found themselves involved in the power games between the Turks and the Chinese dynasties of Sui and Tang. It is estimated the Khitan had only around 43,000 soldiersa fraction of the Turkic Khaganates. In 605, the Khitan raided China, but the Emperor Yangdi of the Sui dynasty was able to convince the Turks to send 20,000 horsemen to aid China against the Khitan. In 628, under the leadership of tribal chief Dahe Moui, the Khitan submitted to the Tang dynasty, as they had earlier submitted to the Eastern Turks. The Khagan of the Eastern Turks, Jiali Khan, offered to exchange the Chinese rebel Liang Shi Du for the Khitan, but Emperor Taizong would not agree to the exchange.

During the reign of Empress Wu, nearly one century later, the Second Turkic Khaganate raided along Northern China's borderlands. The Tang Empress, in what scholars consider a major strategic error, formed an ill-fated alliance with the Turkic leader Qapaghan Qaghan to punish the Khitan for raiding Hebei province. Khitan territory was much closer to Northern China than Turkic lands, and the Turks used it to launch their own raids into Hebei.

Like the Tuyuhun and Tangut, the Khitan remained an intermediate power along the borderlands through the 7th and 8th centuries. The Khitans rose to prominence in a power vacuum that developed in the wake of the Kyrgyz takeover of the Uyghur Khaganate, and the collapse of the Tang dynasty.

Liao dynasty 

Abaoji, who had been successful in uniting the Khitan tribes, founded the Liao dynasty in 907. The Liao territory included modern day northern and northeastern China, Mongolia, and parts of Central Asia and Siberia. Although transition to an imperial social and political organization was a significant change for the Khitans, the Khitan language, origin myth, shamanic religion and nomadic lifestyle endured.

China was in chaos after the fall of the Tang dynasty in 907. Known as the Wudai Shiguo period, Five Dynasties ruled northern China in rapid succession with only nominal support from the Ten Kingdoms of southern China. The Tang dynasty had been supported by Shatuo Turks until Zhu Wen murdered the last Tang emperor and founded the Later Liang dynasty. The Shatuo Turks, who had been allied with the Khitans since 905, defeated the Later Liang and founded the Later Tang dynasty in 923, but by 926 the former allies had grown apart.  In 934 Yelü Bei, Abaoji's son, wrote to his brother Emperor Taizong of Liao from the Later Tang court: "Li Cong Ke has slain his liege-lord, why not attack him?" In 936, the Khitans supported Shi Jing Tangs rebellion against the Later Tang Emperor Li Cong Ke. Shi Jing Tang became emperor of the Later Jin dynasty and, in exchange for their support, the Khitans gained sixteen new prefectures.
 
The Later Jin dynasty remained a vassal of the Khitans until the death of Shi Jing Tang in 942, but when the new emperor ascended, he indicated that he would not honor his predecessor's arrangement. The Khitans launched a military invasion against the Later Jin in 944. In January 947, the Emperor of the Later Jin dynasty surrendered to the Khitans. The Khitan emperor left the conquered city of Kaifeng and unexpectedly died from an illness while travelling in May 947.

Relations between Goryeo and the Khitans were hostile after the Khitans destroyed Balhae. Goryeo would not recognize the Liao dynasty and supported the fledgling Song dynasty, which had formed south of the Khitans' territory. Though the Khitans would have preferred to attack China, they invaded Goryeo in 993. Khitan forces failed to advance beyond the Chongchon River and were persuaded to withdraw, though Khitan dissatisfaction with Goryeo's conquest of the Jurchen prompted a second invasion in 1010. This time the Khitans, led by their emperor, sacked the capital city Kaesong. A third and final invasion in 1018 was repelled by Goryeo's forces, bringing an end to 30 years of war between the rivals.
 
The Liao dynasty proved to be a significant power north of the Chinese plain, continuously moving south and west, gaining control over former Chinese and Turk-Uyghur territories. In 1005 Chanyuan Treaty was signed, and peace remained between the Liao dynasty and the Song dynasty for the next 120 years. During the reign of the Emperor Daozong of Liao, corruption was a major problem and prompted dissatisfaction among many people, including the Jurchens. The Liao dynasty eventually fell to the Jin dynasty of the Jurchen in 1125, who defeated and absorbed the Khitans to their military benefit. The Khitans considered the Khamag Mongols as their last hope when the Liao dynasty was invaded by the Jin, Song dynasty and Western Xia Empires.

To defend against the Jurchens and Khitans, a Long Wall was built by Goryeo in 1033–1034, along with many border forts.

One of the causes of the Jurchen rebellion and the fall of the Liao was the custom of raping married Jurchen women and Jurchen girls by Khitan envoys, which caused resentment from the Jurchens. The custom of having sex with unmarried girls by Khitan was itself not a problem, since the practice of guest prostitution – giving female companions, food and shelter to guests – was common among Jurchens. Unmarried daughters of Jurchen families of lower and middle classes in Jurchen villages were provided to Khitan messengers for sex, as recorded by Hong Hao. Song envoys among the Jin were similarly entertained by singing girls in Guide, Henan. There is no evidence that guest prostitution of unmarried Jurchen girls to Khitan men was resented by the Jurchens. It was only when the Khitans forced aristocratic Jurchen families to give up their beautiful wives as guest prostitutes to Khitan messengers that the Jurchens became resentful. This suggests that in Jurchen upper classes, only a husband had the right to his married wife while among lower class Jurchens, the virginity of unmarried girls and sex with Khitan men did not impede their ability to marry later. The Jurchens and their Manchu descendants had Khitan linguistic and grammatical elements in their personal names like suffixes. Many Khitan names had a "ju" suffix.

Following the fall of the Liao dynasty, a number of the Khitan nobility escaped the area westwards towards Western Regions, establishing the short-lived Qara Khitai or Western Liao dynasty. After its fall, a small part under Buraq Hajib established a local dynasty in the southern Persian province of Kirman. These Khitans were absorbed by the local Turkic and Iranian populations, Islamized and left no influence behind them. As the Khitan language is still almost completely unintelligible, it is difficult to create a detailed history of their movements.

During the 13th century, the Mongol invasions and conquests had a large impact on shifting ethnic identities in the region. Most people of the Eurasian Steppe did not retain their pre-Mongol identities after the conquests. The Khitans were scattered across Eurasia and assimilated into the Mongol Empire in the early 13th century.

Fleeing from the Mongols, in 1216 the Khitans invaded Goryeo and won several battles, even reaching the gates of the capital, but were defeated by Goryeo General Kim Chwi-ryeo who pushed them back north to Pyongan, where the remaining Khitans were finished off by Goryeo forces in 1219.

Language and writing systems 

The Khitan language is now extinct. Some scholars believe that Khitan is Proto-Mongolic, while others have suggested that it is a Para-Mongolic language.  Khitan has loanwords borrowed from the Turkic Old Uyghur language and Koreanic languages.

There were two writing systems for the Khitan language, known as the large script and the small script. These were functionally independent and appear to have been used simultaneously in the Liao dynasty. They were in use for some time after the fall of that dynasty. Examples of the scripts appeared most often on epitaphs and monuments, although other fragments sometimes surface. The Khitan scripts have not been fully deciphered and more research and discoveries will be necessary for a proficient understanding of them.

Economy

As nomadic Khitans originally engaged in stockbreeding, fishing, and hunting. Looting Chinese villages and towns as well as neighboring tribes was also a helpful source of slaves, Chinese handcraft, and food, especially in times of famine. Under the influence of China, and following the administrative need for a sedentary administration, the Khitans began to engage in farming, crop cultivation and the building of cities. Different from the Chinese and Balhae farmers, who cultivated wheat and sorghum millet, the Khitan farmers cultivated panicled millet. The ruling class of the Liao dynasty still undertook hunting campaigns in late summer in the tradition of their ancestors. After the fall of the Liao dynasty, the Khitans returned to a more nomadic life.

Religion

The Khitans practiced shamanism in which animals played an important role. Hunters would offer a sacrifice to the spirit of the animal they were hunting and wore a pelt from the same animal during the hunt. There were festivals to mark the catching of the first fish and wild goose, and annual sacrifices of animals to the sky, earth, ancestors, mountains, rivers, and others. Every male member of the Khitan would sacrifice a white horse, white sheep, and white goose during the Winter solstice.

When a Khitan nobleman died, burnt offerings were sacrificed at the full and new moons. The body was exposed for three years in the mountains, after which the bones would be cremated. The Khitan believed that the souls of the dead rested at a place called the Black Mountain, near Rehe Province.

Khitan tents always faced east, and they revered the sun, but the moon did not have a large role in their religion. They also practiced a form of divination where they went to war if the shoulder blade of a white sheep cracked while being heated (scapulimancy).

Women
Khitan women hunted, rode horses and practiced archery. They did not practice foot binding, which started becoming popular among the Han during the Song dynasty. The Khitan practiced polygamy and generally preferred marriage within the tribe, but it was not unknown for an Emperor to take wives from other groups, such as Han, Korean, and Turkic.

Genetics

A 2015 study postulated that elite Khitan males may have belonged to haplogroups C3c or N1, based on the distribution of these haplogroups in modern-day Eastern and Central Asian populations.

A 2020 study published in Cell analyzed the DNA of 3 Khitan elite burials from Bulgan Province, located in Northern Mongolia. The Khitan burials were found to be of predominantly Northeast Asian origin, with less than 10% West Eurasian ancestry. The two male specimens belonged to the West Eurasian paternal haplogroup J2. All three specimens carried maternal haplogroups associated with Northeast Asia, including haplogroups A24, D4 and haplogroup Y1. During the Khitan and Mongol empires, a male bias for East-Asian related ancestry is observed in the eastern steppe region.

Two studies found evidence of Khitan mtDNA ancestry in modern-day people of the Daur ethnicity. This was one of the most significant findings of ethnic studies in China. Another group of 100,000 descendants are found in some Blang people and Yi people in Baoshan and Ruili in southwestern Yunnan province, near Myanmar. These people with surnames of A., Mang and Jiang claim to be descendants of Khitans rather than Blang people or Yi people.

Gallery

See also 

 History of the Khitans
 List of Khitan rulers
 Yelü
 Liao dynasty
 Northern Liao
 Qara Khitai (Western Liao dynasty)
 Eastern Liao
 Later Liao
 Qutlugh-Khanids
 Cathay
 Mongol mythology

References

Citations

Sources 

 Works cited
 
 
 
 
  
 
 
 
 
 
 
 
 
 
 
 
 
 
 
 
 
 

 Other webpages
 Khitans
 Khitans on scholar.google.com
 Exhibition of Khitan artifacts
 Khitan gers

 
 
Ancient peoples of China